St. John Knits International Inc., commonly referred as St. John, is a luxury American fashion brand that specializes in women's knitwear  founded in 1962 by Robert and Marie Gray. The company is best known for its classic wool and rayon yarn knits, Chanel inspired jackets, and extensive use of primary colors.

History 
St. John was founded in 1962 by former model Marie St John and her husband Robert Gray. While working in Los Angeles as a model, St John hand knit  simple straight knit skirts and matching short sleeved tops for her own use. Her designs proved popular among her fellow models and she began designing and producing samples. Her fiancé at the time, Robert Gray, showed the designs to local retailer Bullock's who ordered 84 dresses. St John and Gray hired their mothers and another knitter and quickly set about production. The couple, now married, divided duties over the fledgling Irvine, CA business. St John designed the clothes and oversaw production while Gray handled the marketing and sales. Their collections included tailored suits and dresses as well as casual sportswear.

In 1990, Escada, formed by another husband and wife team Margaretha and Wolfgang Ley, purchased an 80% stake in St John Knits for $45 million.  St John Knits used the funding to launch its own boutique stores. St John became a publicly owned company in 1993, with St John and Gray retaining 20% of the company. St John continued to manage the creative direction of the company while Gray served as CEO and chairman of the board. Their daughter, Kelly Gray, was appointed president of the company in 1996, ascending to the CEO position after her father's retirement in 2002. The Grays left St John Knits in 2005 when the company was purchased by a private equity firm. The pair were brought back only two years later as creative consultants after a series of disappointing collections and declining sales.

The original face of the brand was model Kelly Gray, the daughter of the founders. Following Gray, supermodel Gisele Bündchen became the new face of St. John in 2005. Beginning in 2005, Angelina Jolie became the face and spokeswoman for St. John. The campaigns were all shot by Mario Testino. In 2010, St. John announced that they were replacing Jolie with British supermodel and musician Karen Elson after her three-year campaign as the face of the company, because Jolie's fame had "overshadowed the brand." In 2011, Kate Winslet was named the face of St John, a position she continues to hold as of 2015.

″St. John Knits' carved a lasting place for itself in the business world by selling to large, established retailers such as Jacobson's and Lord & Taylor, cultivating a relationship that would propel its growth for decades. Underpinning its respected standing among retailers were the company's distinctive lines of clothing, which began to attract a devout clientele drawn to Marie St. John's classically conservative fashion style. As one retail consultant explained, "For ladies who lunch, a St. John knit is almost like a uniform, a status symbol," which neatly described the company's typical retail customer and conveyed the essence of the clothes' success: generations of women made the inclusion of a St. John knit in their wardrobe a must.″ A St. John's garment can be identified by its knit-in hem (most companies use sewn-in hems) and the tightly woven wool and rayon double knit fabric developed by Marie St John in 1962. The St. John Sport line contains more on trend styles.

St. John today 
Headquartered in Irvine, California, the brand has its collections and styles sold in specialty stores in 29 countries and 27 company-owned retail boutiques in the United States.  The company has an estimated 1,300 employees and 2010 sales of $325 million. They have recently begun selling designer masks that may not be ideal to stop the spread of COVID-19 because they are made with a knit rayon rather than two layers of tightly woven cotton, which has been recommended by the CDC. There has been some backlash, to which they have issued a disclaimer citing that their masks are not effective as PPE and are not intended to be used as such.<ref>

The team of stylists is led by Zoe Turner, a British designer who comes from Christian Dior Couture, Alberta Ferretti and Max Mara. Having completed the European phase, based between Paris, where Turner resides, and Milan, the new creative director has just relocated in Irvine.

Turner is responsible for St. John's collections, retail environments and the 57-year-old firm's multimedia presence. Turner's first collection for St. John will be fall 2020.

References

External links 
 

Clothing brands of the United States
High fashion brands
Companies based in Irvine, California
Manufacturing companies based in California
American companies established in 1962
Clothing companies established in 1962
1962 establishments in California